Liu Yanan (born 25 February 1992) is a Chinese professional racing cyclist. She rides for China Chongming-Liv-Champion System Pro Cycling. She is from Heilongjiang.

See also
 List of 2015 UCI Women's Teams and riders

References

External links

1992 births
Living people
Chinese female cyclists
Cyclists from Heilongjiang
21st-century Chinese women